Sunrise on the Matterhorn is painting by American artist Albert Bierstadt. Done in oil on canvas and depicting the famous Matterhorn, the painting was produced during one of Bierstadt's numerous trips to Switzerland between the years 1867 and 1897. The painting is currently in the collection of the Metropolitan Museum of Art.

References 

Paintings in the collection of the Metropolitan Museum of Art
Paintings by Albert Bierstadt
Matterhorn
19th-century paintings